Maud Marshal, Countess of Norfolk, Countess of Surrey (1192 – 27 March 1248) was an Anglo-Norman noblewoman and a wealthy co-heiress of her father William Marshal, 1st Earl of Pembroke, and her mother Isabel de Clare suo jure 4th Countess of Pembroke. Maud was their eldest daughter. She had two husbands: Hugh Bigod, 3rd Earl of Norfolk, and William de Warenne, 5th Earl of Surrey.

Maud was also known as Matilda Marshal.

Family
Maud's birthdate is unknown other than being post 1191. She was the eldest daughter of William Marshal, 1st Earl of Pembroke and Isabel de Clare, 4th Countess of Pembroke, herself one of the greatest heiresses in Wales and Ireland. Maud had five brothers and four younger sisters. She was a co-heiress to her parents' extensive rich estates.

Her paternal grandparents were John FitzGilbert Marshal and Sybilla of Salisbury, and her maternal grandparents were Richard de Clare, 2nd Earl of Pembroke, known as "Strongbow", and Aoife of Leinster.

Marriages and issue
Sometime before Lent in 1207, Maud married her first husband, Hugh Bigod, 3rd Earl of Norfolk. It was through this marriage between Maud and Hugh that the post of Earl Marshal of England came finally to the Howard Dukes of Norfolk. In 1215, Hugh was one of the twenty-five sureties of Magna Carta. He came into his inheritance in 1221, thus Maud became the Countess of Norfolk at that time. Together they had children:
 Roger Bigod, 4th Earl of Norfolk (1209–1270) He died childless.
 Hugh Bigod (1212–1266), Justiciar of England. Married Joan de Stuteville, by whom he had issue.
 Isabel Bigod (c. 1215–1250), married firstly Gilbert de Lacy of Ewyas Lacy, by whom she had issue; she married secondly John Fitzgeoffrey, Lord of Shere, by whom she had issue.
 Ralph Bigod (born c. 1218, date of death unknown), married Bertha de Furnival, by whom he had one child.
  
Hugh Bigod died in 1225. Maud married her second husband, William de Warenne, 5th Earl of Surrey before 13 October that same year. Together they had two children:
 Isabella de Warenne (c. 1228 – before 20 September 1282), married Hugh d'Aubigny, 5th Earl of Arundel. She died childless.
John de Warenne, 6th Earl of Surrey (August 1231 – c. 29 September 1304), in 1247 married Alice de Lusignan, a half-sister of King Henry III of England, by whom he had three children.
Maud's second husband died in 1240. Her youngest son John succeeded his father as the 6th Earl of Surrey, but as he was a minor, Peter of Savoy, uncle of Queen consort Eleanor of Provence, was guardian of his estates.

Death
Maud died on 27 March 1248 at the age of about fifty-six years and was buried at Tintern Abbey with her mother, possibly her maternal grandmother, and two of her brothers.

Maud Marshal in literature
Maud Marshal is the subject of a novel by Elizabeth Chadwick, titled To Defy a King. In the book she is called Mahelt rather than Maud.   She and her first husband Hugh Bigod appear as secondary characters in books chronicling their parents's lives: The Time of Singing (UK: Sphere, 2008) published in the US as For the King's Favor; The Greatest Knight; and The Scarlet Lion.

Ancestors

References

 Thomas B. Costain, The Magnificent Century, published by Doubleday and Company, Garden City, New York, 1959
 Charles Cawley, Medieval Lands, Earls of Pembroke
 thePeerage.com/p 10677.htm#106761

1192 births
1248 deaths
12th-century English people
12th-century English women
13th-century English people
13th-century English women
Daughters of British earls
Norfolk